Texans Never Cry is a 1951 American Western film directed by Frank McDonald and written by Norman S. Hall. The film stars Gene Autry, Mary Castle, Russell Hayden, Gail Davis, Tom Keene and Don C. Harvey. The film was released on March 15, 1951, by Columbia Pictures.

Plot
Gene Autry and the Texas Rangers investigate the counterfeiting of Mexican lottery tickets.

Cast
Gene Autry as Gene Autry
Mary Castle as Rita Bagley
Russell Hayden as Steve Diamond 
Gail Davis as Nancy Carter
Tom Keene as Tracy Wyatt 
Don C. Harvey as Blackie Knight
Roy Gordon as Frank Bagley
Pat Buttram as Pecos Bates
Michael Ragan as Rip Braydon
Frank Fenton as Capt. Weldon
Sandy Sanders as Bart Thomas
John R. McKee as Edward Dunham
Harry Mackin as Bill Ross
Harry Tyler as Dan Carter
Minerva Urecal as Martha Carter
Richard Flato as Carlos Corbal
I. Stanford Jolley as Red
Duke York as Baker
Roy Butler as Sheriff Weems
Champion as Gene's Horse

References

External links
 

1951 films
1950s English-language films
American Western (genre) films
1951 Western (genre) films
Columbia Pictures films
Films directed by Frank McDonald
American black-and-white films
1950s American films